Edna Shemesh (née Erika Lev; born May 19, 1953) is an Israeli novelist, short story writer, translator, book reviewer, former journalist and independent editor.

Biography
Born in 1953 in Cluj, Romania, she immigrated to Israel with her family at the age of four. She studied at the Hebrew University in Jerusalem, where she earned her B.A. in English Literature and The History of Theatre, as well as a diploma for English teaching. She is a certified radio speaker by the Israeli Broadcasting Authority and a graduate of the Translation and Translation Editing program at Tel Aviv University.

Her fiction and poetry have been published in Keshet HaHadasha, Noga, Jewish Fiction .net, Ahshav, Moznayim, Iton 77, Masmerim, Petel, The Short Story Project, Jewish Literary Journal, nrg, Ynet, and in various other publications, including anthologies such as Le Miroir (France) and Beit HaDyo (Israel). She Writes regularly for the children's magazine Eynaim. Her book reviews have been published in Haaretz daily and Iton 77 magazine.

||Shemesh wrote magazine articles for Bamakom of Yediot daily and Arim of Shoken daily, and as an independent journalist she published in The Jerusalem Post, The Jerusalem Report, nrg, Masa Acher, Masa Tsair and Ynet. She has been invited to give talks about her writing at Harvard University (2015), the National Library of New Zealand and The Shoa Center at Wellington (2016), at SIS University at Shanghai, China (2016) and the TOLI International Teachers Conference at Lisbon, Portugal (2018). She was awarded the MacDowell Fellowship in 2017.

Personal life
Shemesh is married to Aldo Shemesh, professor at the Weizmann Institute of Science, and has three children. She lives in Rehovot, Israel

Publications

Novels and short fiction
 Amstel (2007)
 The Sand Dunes of Paris (2013)
 Hotel Malta (2015)
 Go, Pave the Sea (2018)

Translation into Hebrew
 Barack Obama, Dreams from My Father
 John Berendt, The City of Falling Angels
 Tracy Chevalier, Burning Bright
 George Hagen, The Laments

Awards, grants and fellowships
 2002 – First prize in the radical feminist Noga magazine short story competition, for “Arabesque”
 2002 – Women Writers of the Mediterranean Award (Marseilles, France), for “Arabesque” in its French translation
 2004 – First Prize in the Iton 77 magazine anonymous short story competition, for “Into the Water”
 2014 – Am HaSeffer translation grant by The Israeli Ministry of Culture, for the English translation of The Sand Dunes of Paris
 2016 – Am HaSeffer translation grant by The Israeli Ministry of Culture, for the English translation of Hotel Malta
 2016 – The Shanghai Writers Program (China)
 2017 – The MacDowell Fellowship (USA)

References

External links
 Edna Shemesh, The Institute for the Translation of Hebrew Literature
 Edna Shemesh, the Modern Hebrew Literature - a Bio-Bibliographical Lexicon

Works:
 Hotel Malta (Excerpt from a Novel), trans. by Charles Kamen, Jewish Fiction .net
 The Sand Dunes of Paris (Excerpt from a Novel), trans. by Charles Kamen, Jewish Fiction .net

1953 births
Living people
Israeli journalists
Israeli novelists
Israeli translators
People from Rehovot
Israeli people of Romanian-Jewish descent
Romanian emigrants to Israel
Hebrew University of Jerusalem alumni